Viavenator (meaning "road hunter") is a genus of carnivorous abelisaurid theropod dinosaur discovered in Argentina's Bajo de la Carpa Formation. It coexisted with the megaraptoran Tratayenia rosalesi.

Classification 
Filippi classified Viavenator to a new clade known as the Furileusauria, which includes Viavenator as well as Carnotaurus. This would have meant Viavenator was closer to Carnotaurus than Majungasaurus. It would have been  in length.

Palaeobiology  

Viavenator possessed a similar brain morphology to Aucasaurus, another South American abelisaurid and had a similar inner ear. Compared to the Madagascan abelisaurid Majungasaurus, Viavenator was more reliant more on quick movements of the head and sophisticated gaze stabilization mechanisms; however, both genera had a similar range of hearing according to the examinations and subsequent CT scans of the cranium.

See also 
 Timeline of ceratosaur research
 2016 in paleontology

References 

Brachyrostrans
Santonian life
Late Cretaceous dinosaurs of South America
Cretaceous Argentina
Fossils of Argentina
Bajo de la Carpa Formation
Fossil taxa described in 2016